Vision Racing was a racing team in the Indy Racing League founded in 2005 when Tony George purchased the assets of the defunct Kelley Racing and hired his stepson Ed Carpenter to be the driver. The team has previously raced in the Izod IndyCar Series, Firestone Indy Lights and the Grand-Am Sports Car Series. The team suspended operations in January 2010.

George and Carpenter formed a new race team in 2012, Ed Carpenter Racing.

Season history

2005
In its first season in the IRL the team was consistently one of the slowest on the track. Although, Carpenter finished 11th in the 2005 Indianapolis 500 and added the team's first top-10 finish at Nashville Superspeedway. Carpenter ended  the season eighteenth in driver points and the team finished a disappointing twentieth in entrant points. The team also fielded Nick Bussell and Jay Drake in the Indy Pro Series. Drake picked up five top five finishes and ended up ninth in points while Bussell had eleven top five finishes and finished an impressive fourth in points. Though both drivers did very well the team did not return to the Pro Series the following year.

2006 
The team returned in 2006 hiring of a new team engineer and expansion to two cars with veteran race winner Tomas Scheckter. The team fared much better with Scheckter capturing a 3rd-place finish at the Milwaukee Mile and finishing 10th in points while Carpenter improved from 18th to 14th in points and captured his first top-five. The team also fielded the number 90 Rock & Republic car driven by Townsend Bell for the Indy 500. Bell retired early from the race as did Scheckter, but Carpenter finished in eleventh. Actor Patrick Dempsey also joined the team in 2006 as co-owner.

2007 
In 2007 the team expanded to three cars with the addition of A. J. Foyt IV and picked up Hitachi, Lowe's and Joost as sponsors. Foyt matched Scheckter's team-best 3rd-place finish with a race-leading run at Kentucky Speedway. Vision fielded a fourth car driven by veteran Davey Hamilton and sponsored by HP for the Indy 500. Hamilton finished an impressive ninth just two spots behind teammate Thomas Scheckter in seventh. Scheckter finished tenth in points with Foyt finishing fourteenth and Carpenter finishing in fifteenth.

2008 
The team returned to 2 cars in 2008 with Carpenter and Foyt IV sponsored by Menards, DirecTV, and CardioCheck. Vision looked strong at Homestead Miami Speedway posting impressive speeds during practice. Carpenter qualified second and Foyt qualified third. However, the team was penalized and had to start in the last two positions after failing technical inspection. The IRL confiscated all the team's rear wings but did not specify on the problem. The team later fired team manager Larry Curry because of the incident.  Carpenter finished the season fifteenth in points and his teammate Foyt finished nineteenth. Vision Racing entered a third car for the Indy 500 and ran Davey Hamilton as the driver and HP as a sponsor.  They ran a third car for Paul Tracy at the Rexall Edmonton Indy in conjunction with Walker Racing with Subway Restaurants as the sponsor.

2009 
In 2009 Ryan Hunter-Reay joined the team alongside the returning Carpenter, and immediately posted the team's best ever finish with a 2nd place at the opening St. Petersburg race. Carpenter matched the result by taking his best career finish of 2nd at Kentucky Speedway in an exciting duel with Ryan Briscoe, with Briscoe edging him at the line.

2010 
On January 28, George was forced to suspend operations due to lack of sponsorship. George later paired up with Panther Racing for a part-time program for his stepson, Ed Carpenter.

Drivers who have driven for Vision Racing
 John Andretti (2008) (Grand-Am Sports Car Series)
 Townsend Bell (2006) (IndyCar Series)
 Nick Bussell (2005) (Indy Lights)
 Ed Carpenter (2005–2009) (IndyCar Series, Indy Lights, and Grand-Am Sports Car Series)
 James Davison (2009) (Indy Lights)
 Jay Drake (2005) (Indy Lights)
 A. J. Foyt IV (2007–2008) (IndyCar Series and Grand-Am Sports Car Series)
 Tony George (2007–2008) (Grand-Am Sports Car Series)
 Phil Giebler (2005) (Indy Lights)
 Stephan Gregoire (2007) (Grand-Am Sports Car Series)
 Davey Hamilton (2007, 2008) (IndyCar Series; Indy 500 only)
 Ryan Hunter-Reay (2009) (IndyCar Series)
 Vítor Meira (2008) (Grand-Am Sports Car Series)
 Tomas Scheckter (2006–2007) (IndyCar Series and Grand-Am Sports Car Series)
 Paul Tracy (2008) (IndyCar Series; Rexall Edmonton Indy only)

Racing results

Complete IRL IndyCar Series results
(key)

 Non-points-paying, exhibition race.
 Run in conjunction with Walker Racing.

References

External links
Vision Racing official website

IndyCar Series teams
American auto racing teams
Indy Lights teams